The American automobile manufacturer General Motors sold a number of vehicles under its marque Oldsmobile, which started out as an independent company in 1897 and was eventually shut down due to a lack of profitability in 2004.

Production models

1900–1919 

Notes

1920–1969 

Notes

1970–1989

1990–2004

Concept Vehicles 

 1953 Starfire X-P Rocket 
 1954 Cutlass
 1954 F-88
 1955 88 Delta 
 1956 Golden Rocket
 1957 F-88 Mark II 
 1959 F-88 Mark III 
 1962 X-215 
 1966 Toronado 
 1967 Thor 
 1968 XP-866 
 1970 XP-888-GT 
 1977 Mirage J-Coupe 
 1986 Incas
 1987 Aerotech
 1988 Aerotech II 
 1989 Aertotech III
 1989 Tube Car
 1990 Expression
 1991 Achieva
 1992 Anthem 
 1995 Antares
 1997 Alero Alpha
 1999 Recon
 2000 Profile
 2001 O4

Notes

See also 
 Oldsmobile
 Oldsmobile V8 Engine
 General Motors
 List of defunct automobile manufacturers of the United States

References

Oldsmobile concept vehicles
Oldsmobile
Oldsmobile